The 1987/88 FIS Nordic Combined World Cup was the fifth World Cup season of Nordic combined, a combination of ski jumping and cross-country skiing organized by International Ski Federation. It started on 18 Dec 1987 in Bad Goisern, Austria and ended on 25 March 1988 in Rovaniemi, Finland.

Calendar

Men

Standings

Overall

Nations Cup

References

External links 
FIS Nordic Combined World Cup 1987/88 

1987 in Nordic combined
1988 in Nordic combined
FIS Nordic Combined World Cup